{{DISPLAYTITLE:C2H2Cl2O2}}
The molecular formula C2H2Cl2O2 (molar mass: 128.94 g/mol, exact mass: 127.9432 u) may refer to:

 Chloromethyl chloroformate
 Dichloroacetic acid